Jucielen Cerqueira Romeu (born 13 April 1996) is a Brazilian boxer. She competed in the women's featherweight event at the 2020 Summer Olympics.

References

External links
 

1996 births
Living people
Brazilian women boxers
Olympic boxers of Brazil
Boxers at the 2020 Summer Olympics
Place of birth missing (living people)
Pan American Games medalists in boxing
Medalists at the 2019 Pan American Games
Pan American Games silver medalists for Brazil
20th-century Brazilian women
21st-century Brazilian women
People from Rio Claro, São Paulo